Roger Hugh Bedford Jr. (born July 2, 1956) is an American lawyer and politician from Alabama. He is a former Democratic member of the Alabama Senate, where he represented the 6th District from 1994–2014. He previously served from 1982 to 1990.

Career

Bedford received his education at the University of Alabama, and his J.D. degree from Cumberland School of Law, Samford University. He is a Rotarian, and belongs to the Alabama State Bar, the Cattlemen's Association, the National Rifle Association, Ducks Unlimited, American Cancer Society, Executive member of the Boy Scouts of America, and the Greater Alabama Council.

In 1996 Bedford was the Democratic nominee for U.S. Senate, but was defeated by Republican Jeff Sessions. On April 2, 2009, multiple sources reported Senator Bedford had received encouragement to run for the Democratic nomination for Alabama governor in 2010. He did not enter the race. Later that month, on April 30, 2009, Bedford inserted a "poison pill" into a Senate bill that would have made it easier for U.S. soldiers serving overseas to vote, thereby causing it to fail. The poison pill "would prohibit a federal candidate or officeholder from transferring funds to a state campaign for office" and was widely seen as an attempt at preventing Artur Davis from transferring funds from his Congressional campaign to his state race for governor.

Family

He is married to the former Maudie Darby from Florence, Alabama and they are the parents of one child: Roger, III.

References

External links
 Project Vote Smart – Senator Roger Bedford, Jr. (AL) profile
 Follow the Money – Roger Bedford, Jr.
 2006 2002 1998 campaign contributions

|-

|-

|-

1956 births
Democratic Party Alabama state senators
Living people
Place of birth missing (living people)
20th-century American politicians
University of Alabama alumni
Cumberland School of Law alumni
21st-century American politicians
Candidates in the 1996 United States elections